Here are the most notable entertainment Italian awards for theater, cinema, television, music and fashion. The more important are the Ubu Awards for theater, the David of Donatello for cinema, the Premio Regia Televisiva for television, the Sanremo Music Festival for music and Miss Italia for fashion and beauty.

Theater
 Ubu Awards

Cinema
 David di Donatello
 Nastro d'Argento
 Ciak d'oro
 Grolla d'oro
 Globo d'oro

International Film Festivals
 Venice Film Festival
 Turin Film Festival
 International Rome Film Festival
 Taormina Film Fest

Television
 Premio Regia Televisiva
 Telegatto

Music
 Sanremo Music Festival Awards (numerous awards; twenty in 2013)
 Rassegna Italiana Canzone d'autore (Premi Tenco and Targhe Tenco)
 Premio Lunezia
 Wind Music Awards (born by defunct awards Festivalbar and Italian Music Awards)
 Sanremo Hits Awards
 Summer Music Awards
 Premio Videoclip Italiano
 Premio Roma Videoclip
 Festival di Castrocaro
 Disco Norba
 TRL Awards
 Venice Music Awards
 MTV Europe Music Awards (for all countries of European Union)
 Eurovision Song Contest (for all countries of European Union: the most important European awards)

Fashion and beauty
 Miss Italia
 Miss Italia nel Mondo
 Miss Italia Regional
 Miss Italia Special Awards

See also
 Italian estimated best-selling music artists

Italian awards